Curtis Stigers (born October 18, 1965) is an American jazz singer. He achieved a number of hits in the early 1990s, most notably the international hit "I Wonder Why" (1991), which reached No. 5 in the UK and No. 9 in the US.

Career
Stigers was born in Hollywood, California, and grew up in Boise, Idaho. He started his music career as a teenager, playing in rock and blues bands, as well as receiving an education in clarinet and saxophone in high school in Boise. He acquired much of his motivation for pursuing jazz from jam sessions led by Gene Harris at the Idanha Hotel. His song "Swingin' Down at Tenth and Main" is a tribute to those times with Harris. After receiving his diploma, he moved to New York City, intending to become a rock musician. But he spent more time in jazz clubs singing and playing saxophone.

Arista released his debut album, which achieved multi-platinum sales. His combination of rock and soul was also popular on the soundtrack to the movie The Bodyguard, which contained his version of "(What's So Funny 'Bout) Peace, Love, and Understanding" by Nick Lowe. Concord Jazz released Baby Plays Around, an album of that included Chris Minh Doky and Randy Brecker He recorded several more jazzy albums for Concord before turning to the country flavor of Let's Go Out Tonight with cover versions of songs by Steve Earle, Richard Thompson, and Hayes Carll.

He has worked with Elton John, Eric Clapton, Prince, Bonnie Raitt, Rod Stewart, The Allman Brothers Band and Joe Cocker. He sang a duet with Julia Fordham on her re-recording of "Where Does the Time Go?" on the 1998 compilation album The Julia Fordham Collection.

His song "I Wonder Why" reached No. 5 on the UK Singles Chart and No. 9 on the United States Billboard Hot 100 chart in 1991, while "You're All That Matters to Me" reached No. 6 as the follow-up single in the UK. In 2006, Stigers participated in the BBC Television show Just the Two of Us, where he sang with journalist Penny Smith. He was one of the soloists at a concert celebrating the MGM musical during the 2009 Proms season. His song "This Life" was for the American television show Sons of Anarchy. He also sang "John the Revelator" for the season one finale.

Discography

Albums
 Curtis Stigers (Arista, 1991)
 Time Was (Arista, 1995)
 Brighter Days (Columbia, 1999)
 Baby Plays Around (Concord Jazz, 2001)
 Secret Heart (Concord Jazz, 2002)
 You Inspire Me (Concord Jazz, 2003)
 I Think It's Going to Rain Today (Concord Jazz, 2005)
 Real Emotional (Concord, 2007)
 Lost in Dreams (Concord, 2009)
 Let's Go Out Tonight (Concord Jazz, 2012)
 Hooray for Love (Concord Jazz, 2014)
 One More for the Road [live] (Concord Jazz, 2014 [rel. 2017]) with the Danish Radio Big Band
 Gentleman (EmArcy, 2020)
 This Life (EmArcy, 2022)

Charting singles

References

External links

1965 births
Living people
American jazz singers
Jazz-pop singers
Smooth jazz singers
Musicians from Boise, Idaho
Concord Records artists
EmArcy Records artists
Arista Records artists
Jazz musicians from Idaho
American baritones
Sons of Anarchy